Haccho Dam is a rockfill dam located in Saga Prefecture in Japan. The dam is used for agriculture. The catchment area of the dam is 1.3 km2. The dam impounds about 6  ha of land when full and can store 347 thousand cubic meters of water. The construction of the dam was started on 1973 and completed in 1982.

References

Dams in Saga Prefecture
1982 establishments in Japan